Tear down the wall(s) may refer to:

Albums
 Tear Down the Walls, a 1964 album by Fred Neil and Vince Martin
 Across the Earth: Tear Down the Walls, a 2009 album by Hillsong United
 Tear Down These Walls, a 1988 album by Billy Ocean

Songs
 "Tear down the wall!", a maxim from "The Trial" by Pink Floyd
 "Tear Down The Wall", a song by Demons and Wizard from the album Demons and Wizards
 "Tear Down The Walls", a song by Arch Enemy from the album Anthems of Rebellion

Other uses
 "Tear Down the Walls", an episode of television program In the Heat of the Night
 Tear down this wall!, a challenge from United States President Ronald Reagan to Soviet leader Mikhail Gorbachev to destroy the Berlin Wall
 Tearing Down the Wall of Sound, biography of Sixties record producer Phil Spector, written by Mick Brown
 Tear Down The Wall, an MS-DOS computer game